The Embassy of Indonesia, Warsaw is the diplomatic mission of the Republic of Indonesia to the Republic of Poland. The current ambassador is Anita Lidya Luhulima who was appointed by President Joko Widodo on 17 November 2021.

History 

Diplomatic relations between Indonesia and Poland started in 1955. Until 12 May 1960, the Indonesian embassy in Prague, Czechoslovakia was accredited to Poland. Then until 18 November 1960, the Indonesian embassy in Moscow, Soviet Union was accredited to Poland. In the same year, a diplomatic mission was established in Warsaw.

The office of the mission was first located in Bristol Hotel at 42/44 Krakowskie Przedmieście. After a year at the hotel, the diplomatic mission moved several times, including to 14 Niegolewskiego (1962–1978) and to a villa that was designed by Lucjan Korngold. Then the offices moved to 9 Wąchocka (1979–2001), which is now the official residence of the ambassador called Wisma Duta, then to 8 Zakopiańska 8 (2001), and finally to its current location at 3/5 Estońskiej.

See also 

 List of diplomatic missions of Indonesia

Gallery

References 

Warsaw
Indonesia
Indonesia–Poland relations